Mitchell Docker (born 2 October 1986) is an Australian former road racing cyclist, who competed as a professional from 2006 to 2021.

In May 2021, Docker announced that he would retire from professional cycling at the end of the 2021 season.

Career
He was born in Melbourne, Victoria, Australia. He joined Australian Junior Road Team in 2003 and joined Drapac Porsche in 2006. He joined the  team for the 2012 season, and remained with the team up until the end of the 2017 season. For 2018, Docker joined .

He has a podcast called Life in the Peloton, in which he talks about being a professional cyclist.

Major results

2005
 8th Overall Herald Sun Tour
2007
 1st Stage 3 Tour de Hokkaido
2008
 1st Stage 5 Tour de East Java
 2nd Drie Zustersteden
 6th Overall Tour de Langkawi
2009
 2nd Halle–Ingooigem
 5th Rund um die Nürnberger Altstadt
2010
 1st Stage 3 Route du Sud
 4th Overall Delta Tour Zeeland
1st Stage 1
 5th Overall Driedaagse van West-Vlaanderen
2011
 6th Gent–Wevelgem
2013
 1st Bay Classic Series, Williamstown
2014
 1st Stage 1 (TTT) Giro d'Italia
2015
 9th Overall Bay Classic Series
2016
 4th Arnhem–Veenendaal Classic
2017
 4th Hong Kong Challenge
 9th Dwars door Vlaanderen

Grand Tour general classification results timeline

References

External links

Mitchell Docker profile

1986 births
Living people
Australian male cyclists
Cyclists from Melbourne